Netherlands-African Business Council (NABC) is a non-profit organization for Dutch companies trading and investing in Africa and vice versa. It supports its members with their activities in Africa by promoting trade with the continent. NABC has been work around the world since it was set up by Heineken and other Dutch companies in 1946. The NABC celebrated their 70th year anniversary in 2016. The Netherlands-African Business Council currently holds 400 members, both Dutch and African. The NABC has contacts and a wide database within the Netherlands and covers all countries in Africa.

Members
The idea behind the NABC is as a business platform for companies that trade and invest in and with Africa to exchange reliable contacts and create business opportunities. The Netherlands-African Business Council currently has 440 company member companies, Dutch as well as African. These companies are active in all sectors of the private sector. Company size varies from entrepreneurialships to multinational corporations such as Royal Dutch Shell, Heineken, Rabobank and Philips. Most member companies are in the Business Service sector, followed by Agriculture and Transport. The NABC supports members with problems and questions they might have in doing business with African companies and governments. Members get discounts on events and activities and get exclusive access to some events, such as the Africa Business Club.

Services

The NABC has become the central point for companies who want to become active in or with Africa. Member companies get support with regards to questions and problems that may arise when business is done with African companies and governments. Next to this the NABC can gets member companies in touch with African companies and governments by either providing contact details or serving as an intermediary.

 Trade missions to and from Africa covering different sectors and countries
 Organizing seminars, workshops and conferences on different sectors and companies
 Creating networking possibilities between companies within this market
 Offering contact details and matchmaking between African and Dutch companies
 Providing business information on the African (and Dutch) market through its media
 Support members with problems and questions they might have in doing business with African companies and governments

Board Members

NABC currently has 15 board members. The NABC board members have many years of experience in doing business with Africa. NABC shares these expertise with member companies both in the Netherlands and in Africa.

Events
NABC organizes different events to keep companies in contact with other entrepreneurs and Africa's opportunities. Events are usually held in the Netherlands and mostly attended by the NABC members, businessmen looking for some matchmaking possibilities, ambassadors and speakers. The NABC organizes seminars that are informative afternoons where speakers from well-known companies or economic attachés from an African country talk about the business opportunities in that country and cover specific topics.

Recent Events

The Netherlands-African Business Council rarely organizes a conference but an example is the first Business Summit Netherlands-African 2010 on 3 November on ‘How to improve your Africa strategy’. Two hundred participants attended this conference which is the first of its kind covering African business opportunities. Many of NABC's African members flew over just to attend this event. The summit was a full day programme in Castle The Wittenburg in Wassenaar (close to The Hague) with 5 workshops and 15 speakers of big Dutch firms that have been active in Africa for a long time. Speakers were present from companies such as Heineken, Rabobank, FMO, TNO, DSM, Philips and Vlisco.

Trade Missions
The Netherlands-African Business Council has the knowledge and experience essential for networking services for the Dutch and African private sector that trade with each other. NABC organizes a couple trade missions per year to and from Africa covering different sectors and countries. There are the incoming trade missions where delegates from a country come to the Netherlands for usually a couple of days to a week. The outgoing trade missions are usually subsidized by the CPA programme in corporation with the NL EVD International. NABC organizes their programme, accommodation and transport. During their stay the participants visit some companies, meet some business people during matchmaking sessions and visit some governmental institutions.

Then there are the outgoing missions which are trade missions to an African country covering a couple of sectors. The aim of such missions is to familiarize Dutch companies with the local business climate, introduce them to local partners and distributors, and to give them an insight into the local private sector development programs. Usually these are attended by 6 to 12 NABC members and sometimes non-members. Members pay their own ticket to the country and accommodation, NABC arranges local transport. To attend the programme is free of charge. The NABC organizes a programme for a couple of days to a week with again some company visits and meetings at some government institutes. Of course there are the infamous matchmaking sessions and some time for leisure which is part of the African business life.

Seeds for Change (S4C)

References

External links 
 

Trade associations based in the Netherlands